Awards and decorations of the Republic of Indonesia are both military and civilian awards for service and personal contributions to the Republic of Indonesia. According to the Constitution of Indonesia, Chapter III Article 15: "The President grants titles, decorations and other honors as regulated by Law".

Refer to Law no. 20/2009, there are three types of awards; the title of National Hero of Indonesia, Mark of Service and Mark of Prestige.

All of the awards and decorations of the Republic of Indonesia are awarded to individuals of Indonesian citizenship and may be awarded to foreign nationals, except for the Samkaryanugraha which is awarded to institutions or organizations. Names of the awards and decorations incorporated abundant sanskrit words, as usually employed by the government in many other awards and names of institutions.

National Hero of Indonesia 

National Hero of Indonesia is the highest-level title awarded in Indonesia. It is posthumously given by the Government of Indonesia for actions which are deemed to be heroic, defined as "actual deeds which can be remembered and exemplified for all time by other citizens" or "extraordinary service furthering the interests of the state and people".

Medali 
Medali is a state award given by the President to someone who is meritorious and has extraordinary achievements in developing and advancing a particular field that is of great benefit to the nation and state.

Medali Kepeloporan (Medal of Pioneership)  
"Medal of Pioneership" is awarded to any person:
 with incredible track record of starting, developing, or promoting the improvements of various sectors of society,
 who has made incredible breakthroughs in science, research, and technology, or
 who has made evident work in national development.

Medali Kejayaan (Medal of Glory) 
"Medal of Glory" is awarded to any person who has "made a name for his/her nation" in education, science, technology, sports, arts, religion, and other sectors of society.

Medali Perdamaian (Medal of Peace)  
"Medal of Peace" is awarded to any person who has contributed and promoted peace and cooperation among the nations of the world.

Stars of the Republic of Indonesia 
President of Indonesia, as the issuer of decorations and the primary owner of star decorations, is automatically awarded the highest class of all civil and military service star decorations. Vice President of Indonesia is also automatically bestowed 2nd class of Star of the Republic of Indonesia and all other highest class civil service star decorations.

Stars for Civil Service

Bintang Republik Indonesia (Star of the Republic of Indonesia) 

The "Star of the Republic of Indonesia" (BRI) is awarded to a person who has given extraordinary service to the integrity, viability, and greatness of Indonesia. It is the highest decoration awarded by the Government of Indonesia.

The BRI is awarded in 5 classes:

Bintang Mahaputera (Star of Mahaputera) 

The "Star of Mahaputera" (BMP) is awarded to a person who has given extraordinary service to the motherland in certain areas outside the military. It is the second highest decoration awarded by the Government of The Republic of Indonesia.

The BMP is awarded in 5 classes:

Bintang Jasa (Star of Service)
The "Star of Service" (BJ) is awarded for civil bravery and courage in times of adversity.

The BJ is awarded in 3 classes:

Bintang Kemanusiaan (Star of Humanities) 
The "Humanities Star" (BK) is awarded to a person who has given extraordinary service in upholding humanities value and human rights.

Bintang Penegak Demokrasi (Star of the Upholder of Democracy) 
The "Star of the Upholder of Democracy" (BPD) is awarded to a person who has given extraordinary for service in upholding democratic principles.

The BPD is awarded in 3 classes:

Bintang Budaya Parama Dharma (Cultural Merit Star) 
The "Cultural Merit Star" (BBPD) is awarded to a person who has given extraordinary involvement in the promotion, education and preservation of Indonesian culture and arts.

Bintang Bhayangkara (National Police Meritorious Service Star) 
The "National Police Meritorious Service Star" (BB) is awarded to personnel of the Indonesian National Police for meritorious service to the nation and in helping to uphold the rule of law. The BB can also be awarded to civilians for extraordinary service in the development and progress of the National Police, as well as in assistance in the performance of the duties and functions of the police as mandated by the constitution and laws of the Republic.

The BB is awarded in three classes:

Stars for military service 
Stars for military service are typically issued to military personnel for sustained meritorious service while serving in the Indonesian National Armed Forces. However, stars may also be issued to civilians for their extraordinary service and contributions made to the advancement and progress of the entire Indonesian National Armed Forces as well as in helping to perform the duties of national defense and community development entrusted to the National Armed Forces by the Constitution.

Bintang Gerilya (Guerrilla Star) 

The "Guerrilla Star" (BG) is awarded to a military serviceman/servicewoman who has given extraordinary service to fight in order to maintain the sovereignty of Republic of Indonesia from foreign aggression. Most BG recipients are military personnel involved in the Indonesian National Revolution.

Bintang Sakti (The Sacred Star) 
"The Sacred Star" (BS) is awarded to personnel of the Indonesian National Armed Forces who distinguished themselves by acts of valor and beyond the call of duty during military operations. The BS can also be awarded to any civilian for extraordinary service and acts of valor beyond the call of duty in the same circumstances.

Bintang Dharma (Military Distinguished Service Star) 
The "Military Distinguished Service Star" (BD) is awarded to armed forces personnel and civilians for extraordinary service and actions beyond the call of duty during military operations and contingencies which helps promote and achieve the advancement of the Indonesian National Armed Forces.

Bintang Yudha Dharma (Grand Meritorious Military Order Star) 
The "Grand Meritorious Military Order Star" (BYD) is awarded to personnel of the Indonesian National Armed Forces or civil servant of ministry of defence or any citizen or foreigner for extraordinary service and on beyond the call of duty for the supervision, development and conduct of any action or activity which can provide extraordinary benefits for the government, people and the Republic of Indonesia, most especially in the field of national defense. In practice, 1st class BYD usually awarded to visiting foreign chief of defense.

The BYD is awarded in 3 classes:

The ribbons of the 2nd and 1st Classes are identical, with the addition of (respectively) one and two central narrow red stripes.

Bintang Kartika Eka Pakçi (Army Meritorious Service Star) 
The "Army Meritorious Service Star" (BKEP) is awarded to personnel of the Indonesian Army for meritorious service and beyond the call of duty for advancement of the Indonesian Army. The BKEP can also be awarded to civilians who provide extraordinary service for advancement of the Indonesian Army.

The BKEP is awarded in 3 classes:

Bintang Jalasena (Navy Meritorious Service Star) 
The "Navy Meritorious Service Star" (BJSN) is awarded to personnel of the Indonesian Navy for meritorious service and beyond the call of duty for advancement of the Indonesian Navy. The BJSN can also be awarded to civilians who provide extraordinary service for advancement of the Indonesian Navy.

The BJSN is awarded in 3 classes:

Bintang Swa Bhuwana Pakça (Air Force Meritorious Service Star) 
The "Air Force Meritorious Service Star" (BSBP) is awarded to personnel of the Indonesian Air Force for meritorious service and beyond the call of duty for advancement of the Indonesian Air Force. The BSBP can also be awarded to civilians who provide extraordinary service for advancement of the Indonesian Air Force.

The BSBP is awarded in 3 classes:

Satyalancana 
Refer to Law no. 20/2009, Satyalancana is round-shaped medal to be awarded by the Government of Indonesia for distinguished individual. In order to execute further the mechanisms of the said Law, the Government of Indonesia passed the Government Regulation no. 35/2010  which stipulates the titles of the Satyalancanas that may be awarded, regulates the process of awarding, the manners of wearing and respecting the decorations.

There are two classifications of Satyalancanas; 20 Satyalancanas are awarded for civilians (which also includes members of the Indonesian National Police), and 13 Satyalancanas are reserved for members of the Indonesian National Armed Forces. Some of the Satyalancanas may also be awarded to foreign nationals, and may be awarded posthumously.

Satyalancana for Civilians

Satyalancana Perintis Kemerdekaan (Medal for Independence Freedom Fighters) 
Awarded to any founders or leaders of Indonesian independence movements/organizations for their contributions in the past to foster awareness of the Indonesian national identity, struggled for independence to the brink of being sentenced to prison by the colonial government, or actively opposed colonialism while not opposing the Indonesian state or its government.

Satyalancana Pembangunan (Medal for Contributing in the National Development)
Awarded to distinguished individuals for their contribution as a whole or in specific sectors or issues for helping the development of the nation.

Satyalancana Wira Karya (Medal for Providing an Example of Meritorious Personality)
Awarded to distinguished individuals for the service to the country and become a role model in their field. The elucidation of Government Regulation num. 35 of the Year 2010 provides that the Satyalancana Wira Karya is awarded to anyone without discriminating their social strata or the sects that they belong.

Satyalancana Kebaktian Sosial (Medal for Service in the Field of Social Welfare)
Awarded to distinguished individuals for their service in social welfare and humanitarianism among the Indonesian people, such as alleviating poverty, providing assistance for orphaned children, and empowering persons with disabilities.

Satyalancana Kebudayaan (Medal for Service in National Culture) 
Awarded to distinguished individuals for their service in upholding Indonesian culture and the arts.

Satyalancana Pendidikan (Medal for Service in the Field of Education) 
Awarded to educators and education staffs for dedicated service in the field of both formal or non-formal education who has served:
 at least 30 days uninterrupted or 90 days with interruptions, or who has died due to natural or social disasters in an Indonesian region,
 at least 3 years uninterrupted or 6 years with interruptions in a remote and disadvantaged region of Indonesia,
 at least 5 years uninterrupted or 8 years with interruptions in a backwarded society such as traditional tribes or in a border region with another country, and
 at least 8 years uninterrupted, with a distinctive achievement in the field of education recognized by society, the Indonesian government, or a national or international institution.

Satyalancana Karya Satya (Civil Servants' Long Service Medal)
Awarded to distinguished civil servants for loyal and faithful service and dedication in Indonesian civil services spanning decades. To be awarded this Satyalancana, a civil servant qualified for the medal must have the following requirements:

 not have a record of severe or medium-level punishment according to present Indonesian laws, or not take any leave that is not financially paid by the state,
 be counted in 10, 20, or 30 years since completing a severe or medium-level punishment and has returned to normal civil services duty, or
 be counted in 10, 20, or 30 years since the appointment as a civil servant probationer

The Satyalancana Karya Satya is awarded in 3 classes:

Note: All classes of Satyalancana Karya Satya medal have exactly same medal design and ribbon, the difference is only color of medal.

Satyalancana Dharma Olahraga (Medal for Contribution in the Field of Sports)
Awarded to distinguished athletes, coaches, judges and sports officials for their meritorious service and dedication towards the advancement and progress of Indonesian sports and also for achievements made for the country in international sporting events.

Eligible international events for nomination to the medal are, among others:

 Summer Olympic Games
 Summer Youth Olympic Games
 Summer Paralympics
 Asian Games
 Asian Beach Games
 Southeast Asian Games
 ASEAN Para Games
 All international individual and team sports events

Satyalancana Dharma Pemuda (Medal for  Youth Contribution)
Awarded to boys and girls aged 16–30 years old for their contributed to the empowerment and development of youths in Indonesia, or for those who have been awarded for their extraordinary achievements at the national level. Being an inspiration to fellow youths is considered a bonus point.

Satyalancana Kepariwisataan (Medal for Tourism)
Awarded to distinguished individuals for their service in developing Indonesia's tourism.

Satyalancana Karya Bhakti Praja Nugraha (Medal for Improving Regional Governance)
Awarded to regional government administrators or employees for their service or performance in realizing an effective governance in regional (provincial or municipal) or community levels.

Satyalancana Pengabdian (Police Long Service Medal)
Awarded to distinguished personnel of the Indonesian National Police for years of loyal and faithful service and dedication.

The Satyalancana Pengabdian is awarded in 4 category:

Satyalancana Bhakti Pendidikan (Medal for Police Education)
Awarded to any personnel of the Indonesian National Police for dedicated service as educators in a police education institution or other education institutions outside the Indonesian National Police for a minimum of 2 years uninterrupted or 3 years with interruptions.
This Satyalancana may also be awarded to any Indonesian and foreign nationals outside the Indonesian National Police who has served as educators or collaborated in the field of police education, scientific research and development for a minimum of 1 year uninterrupted or 2 years with interruptions.

Satyalancana Jana Utama (Medal for Advancing Police Organization)
Awarded to personnel of the Indonesian National Police with a minimum of 8 years of dedicated service in the field of public security and order in advancing the organization of the Indonesian National Police, and Indonesian nationals outside the Indonesian National Police with the same contribution.

Satyalancana Ksatria Bhayangkara (Medal for Meritious Policing Duty)
Awarded to distinguished personnel of the Indonesian National Police for their performance as law enforcers and civil assistance apparatus, and fulfilling professionalism and work ethics in their duty as a police.

Satyalancana Karya Bhakti (Medal for Concrete Work as a Police)
Awarded to personnel of the Indonesian National Police for a concrete work—in policy or in active duty—which advance the work of the National Police and of its mandate, honor the history and heritage of the National Police, and help uphold the values and importance of the organization for the security and welfare of the people.

Satyalancana Operasi Kepolisian (Medal for Police Operation)
Awarded to personnel of the Indonesian National Police who were wounded or killed during a police operation, or who has completed a mission of utmost national significance.

Satyalancana Bhakti Buana (Medal for Police Duty in International Peacekeeping)
Awarded to personnel of the Indonesian National Police for police  service in overseas territory or in any peacekeeping operation as may be permitted by the National Police.

Satyalancana Bhakti Nusa (Medal for Police Duty in Remote Regions)
Awarded to personnel of the Indonesian National Police for their duty in a remote area or an Indonesian border region.

Satyalancana Bhakti Purna (Medal for 32 Years of Police Service)
Awarded to personnel of the Indonesian National Police for 32 years of service and dedication.

Satyalancana for military service

Satyalancana Bhakti (Wounds Medal) 

Awarded to individual or personnel of the Indonesian National Armed Forces who are deemed worthy to receive it, because of combat injuries sustained due to enemy action during military operations.

Satyalancana Teladan (Medal for Active Military Campaign) 
Awarded to any serving personnel of the Indonesian National Armed Forces with a minimum of 1 year uninterrupted service or 3 years of service with interruptions while in performance of national defense responsibilities on any military campaign or operation as may be ordered by the Commander of the National Armed Forces and/or the respective Chiefs of Staff of the service branches of the armed forces wherein he or she is assigned. This Satyalancana can be awarded to the same person more than once.

Satyalancana Kesetiaan (Armed Forces Long Service Medal) 

Awarded personnel of the Indonesian National Armed Forces for years of loyal and faithful service. This is one of only few awards that may be bestowed upon both enlisted personnel and officers of the Armed Forces

The Satyalancana Kesetiaan is awarded in 4 classes:

Satyalancana Santi Dharma (Medal for Active International Military Duty)
Awarded to personnel of the Indonesian National Armed Forces for service as part of a UN peacekeeping force or as wartime foreign military observers during conflicts.

Satyalancana Dwidya Sistha (Medal for Service as a Military Educator)
Awarded to personnel of the Indonesian National Armed Forces for service as instructors at the Military Academies or military recruit training units in any service branch, and to personnel with active duty in any education institutions. This Satyalancana may also be awarded to Indonesian and foreign nationals outside the Indonesian National Armed Forces who also has given contribution in Indonesian military education.

Satyalancana Dharma Nusa (Medal for National Defense Service) 
Awarded to personnel of the Indonesian National Armed Forces or Indonesian National Police, civil servants for their active duty in restoring Indonesian territorial defense or public security, and other Indonesian nationals for the same duty in a zone of conflict inside Indonesian borders. This Satyalancana is awarded to the said individual who as a minimum service time of 90 days uninterrupted or 120 days with interruptions, and may be awarded posthumously.

Satyalancana Dharma Bantala (Medal for Active Duty in the Army)
Awarded to personnel of the Indonesian Army for a minimum of 30 years of loyal and faithful service and dedication, or for those who has been awarded the Satyalancana Kesetiaan, 2nd Class. This Satyalancana may be awarded posthumously.

Satyalancana Dharma Samudra (Medal for Active Duty in the Navy)
Awarded to personnel of the Indonesian Navy for a minimum of 30 years of loyal and faithful service and dedication, or for those who has been awarded the Satyalancana Kesetiaan, 2nd Class. This Satyalancana may be awarded posthumously.

Satyalancana Dharma Dirgantara (Medal for Active Duty in the Air Force)
Awarded to personnel of the Indonesian Air Force for a minimum of 30 years of loyal and faithful service and dedication, or for those who has been awarded the Satyalancana Kesetiaan, 2nd Class. This Satyalancana may be awarded posthumously.

Satyalancana Wira Nusa (Medal for Active Duty in Indonesia's Outer Islands)
Awarded to personnel of the Indonesian National Armed Forces for service in outermost islands of Indonesia for 90 days uninterrupted or 120 days with interruptions. This Satyalancana may be awarded to the same person two times.

Satyalancana Wira Dharma (Medal for Active Duty as a Border Guard)
Awarded to personnel of the Indonesian National Armed Forces for service as a Border Guard Task Force personnel for 90 days uninterrupted or 120 days with interruptions. This Satyalancana may be awarded to the same person two times.

Satyalancana Wira Siaga (Medal for Presidential and Vice Presidential Guards Personnel)
Awarded to personnel of the Indonesian National Armed Forces for service in the Paspampres, the unit of the Indonesian National Armed Forces tasked for protecting the President and Vice President of Indonesia. To be awarded this Satyalancana, the personnel of the Paspampres must be a:
 General officer (generals, admirals, or air force marshals) with a minimum of 1 year of service,
 Field or junior officer (from colonel to second lieutenant rank) with a minimum of 2 years uninterrupted service or 3 years of service with interruptions, and
 Non-commissioned officer or enlisted (below second lieutenant) with a minimum of 3 years uninterrupted service or 4 years of service with interruptions.

Satyalancana Ksatria Yudha (Medal for Active Duty in Military Special Forces)
Awarded to individual or personnel of the Indonesian National Armed Forces with a minimum of 2 years uninterrupted service or 3 years of service with interruptions in the special forces units, or to the said personnel who has excelled in performing his/her duty in the special forces unit that resulted in physical or mental injury, handicap, or even death.

Samkaryanugraha (Citation Awards) 
Samkaryanugraha is award in the form of distinction trophy/pennant for any unit , governmental institution, or other organization with meritorious services. All the Samkaryanugraha has equal ranking, and is classified into civilian and military organizational awards. The object of the award must be put on display at the building of the receiving unit, institution, or organization.

Parasamya Purnakarya Nugraha (Organizational Award for Civilian Institutions) 
The Parasamya Purnakarya Nugraha is an organizational award given by or in behalf of the President of the Republic of Indonesia for meritorious service and dedication of a governmental institution (such as provincial or municipal governments) or civilian organization. The recipient of the Parasamya Purnakarya Nugraha award receives a distinction trophy that resembles a miniature monument with the Garuda Pancasila emblem.

Nugraha Sakanti (National Police Unit Award Citation) 
The Nugraha Sakanti is an organizational award given by or in behalf of the President of the Republic of Indonesia for meritorious service and dedication of units within the Indonesian National Police for the sake of upholding law and order, protecting the citizenry of the Republic, community development, civil assistance and in the performance of actions for the benefit of the people's well-being and safety. The recipient of the Nugraha Sakanti award receives a black triangular distinction pennant with the Garuda Pancasila emblem on its hoist.

Samkaryanugraha (National Armed Forces Unit Award Citation) 
The Samkaryanugraha is an organizational award given by or in behalf of the President of the Republic of Indonesia - in his/her capacity as Commander in Chief - for meritorious service and dedication of units within the Indonesian National Armed Forces for the sake of the performance of its mandate of national defense, community development and in civil assistance operations during calamities and major national events. It is the only organizational award by law to not be given a distinct name. The recipient unit or military institution of the Samkaryanugraha award receives a golden-coloured distinction rectangular pennant with the inscriptions in Indonesian on it, alongside the national emblem and the Presidential seal.

Obsolete Stars and Medals

Obsolete decorations for civil service

Obsolete decorations for military service

References

External links
 

 
Indonesia culture-related lists
Indonesian awards